Grand Central is a 2013 French-Austrian romance film co-written and directed by Rebecca Zlotowski. It was screened in the Un Certain Regard section at the 2013 Cannes Film Festival where it won the François Chalais Prize.

Plot
Gary, an unskilled young man, lands a job as a decontamination sub-contractor at a nuclear power plant in the lower valley of the Rhone. Inducted into the workforce by supervisor Gilles and veteran Toni, Gary discovers that radiation contamination is not just a risk factor but an everyday hazard. At the same time, he begins an illicit affair with Karole, Toni's fiancée. It turns out that Toni is sterile, and Karole becomes pregnant by Gary.

Cast
 Tahar Rahim as Gary Manda 
 Léa Seydoux as Karole 
 Denis Ménochet as Toni 
 Olivier Gourmet as Gilles 
 Johan Libéreau as Tcherno 
 Nahuel Pérez Biscayart as Isaac
 Camille Lellouche as Géraldine 
 Nozha Khouadra as Maria
 Guillaume Verdier as Bertrand 
 Marie Berto as Morali

Soundtrack
Indie pop singer Jeremy Jay recorded the song "Ghost Tracks" for the soundtrack.

Accolades

References

External links
 
 
 

2013 films
2013 romantic drama films
French romantic drama films
Austrian romantic drama films
2010s French-language films
Films shot in Austria
Films shot in France
Films directed by Rebecca Zlotowski
Films featuring a Best Actress Lumières Award-winning performance
Films scored by Robin Coudert
2010s French films